Angels Hard as They Come is a 1971 biker film directed by Joe Viola and starring Scott Glenn, Charles Dierkop, Gary Busey, James Iglehart, and Gilda Texter. It was co-written and produced by Jonathan Demme.

Plot
Long John (Scott Glenn), Juicer (Don Carrara), and Monk (James Iglehart) are members of the Angels motorcycle gang. When one of their drug deals is called off, two members of the Dragons motorcycle gang invite them to the ghost town of Lost Cause, where some hippies have started a commune. General (Charles Dierkop), leader of the Dragons, challenges Long John to a race and loses. Long John then meets the hippie Astrid (Gilda Texter), to whom he is attracted. She says their leaders, Vicki (Janet Wood) and Henry (Gary Busey), are not happy with the Dragons.

That night, several drunk Dragons attempt to gang-rape Astrid. The Angels intervene, and one of the Dragons stabs Astrid to death. The Dragons blame Long John, accusing him of trying to kill General. The next day, the Dragons tie up the Angels and attempt to kill them by riding around them on their motorcycles, swinging chains at them. Long John frees Monk, who escapes. Monk runs out of gas in the desert. Monk is chased by a racist on dune buggy, and eventually steals a camper.

The hippies put drugs into the Dragons' food, and help Long John and Juicer escape. Monk finally reaches the home of Cloud (Lance Hefner), the drug dealer whom the Angels were to have met at the start of the film. The remainder of the Angels are at Cloud's, and they follow Monk back to Lost Cause. In the morning, General ties Vicki to a pole and threatens to burn her alive if the hippies don't turn over Long John and Juicer. Henry attempts to kill General with a knife. General takes it from him, and realizes the knife belongs to a fellow Dragon, Axe (Gary Littlejohn). General now realizes Axe tried to kill him during the rape of Astrid, and kills Axe.

The Angels finally arrive in town, kill all the Dragons, and rescue Long John and Juicer. Everyone leaves town, the bikers going their way and the hippies going another.

Production
Jonathan Demme met Roger Corman while doing publicity on Von Richthofen and Brown. The producer was impressed by publicity material Demme had written and asked if he was interested in writing a motorcycle movie. Demme pitched the idea of a motorcycle version of Rashomon and wrote it with Joe Viola, who directed TV commercials Demme had produced.

Reception
The film was very successful with Corman saying it earned rentals of over $700,000 and returning a profit of 46% within the first year.

See also
 List of American films of 1971

References

External links

Angels Hard as They Come at TCMDB

1971 films
1970s exploitation films
American crime drama films
Outlaw biker films
New World Pictures films
1970s gang films
1970s English-language films
1970s American films